Romana Barrack  (5 August 1928 – 31 May 2016), known professionally as Carla Lane, was an English television writer responsible for several successful British sitcoms, including The Liver Birds (co-creator, 1969–1979), Butterflies (1978–1983), and Bread (1986–1991).

Lane was described as "the television writer who dared to make women funny"; much of her work focused on strong women characters, including "frustrated housewives and working class matriarchs". In later years, she became well known as an animal welfare advocate.

Early life and education
Lane was born in West Derby, Liverpool, in the United Kingdom on 5 August 1928. Her father was Gordon De Vince Barrack, a Welsh-Italian steward in the merchant navy, and her mother was Ivy Amelia (née Foran). She had a younger brother, Ramon, and a sister, Marna. Lane grew up in West Derby and Heswall. She attended a convent school and, aged seven, won a school poetry prize.  She left school aged 14, and worked in nursing.

After leaving school, she worked first in a baby linen shop, then at Bonmarché, and finally at a factory in Prescot. According to her autobiography, she married Eric Arthur Hollins at 17 and had two sons by the age of 19, though official records indicate that she was 19 when she married on 27 March 1948.

Writing career
In the 1960s, Lane wrote short stories and radio scripts. Her first successes came in collaboration with Myra Taylor, whom she had met at a writers' workshop in Liverpool. Lane and Taylor would often meet at the Adelphi Hotel in Liverpool City Centre to write. She said that she used a pseudonym, "Carla Lane", because of her modesty about revealing that she was a writer.

With Taylor, she submitted some comedy sketch scripts to the BBC, where they were seen by Michael Mills, the head of comedy at the time. He encouraged them to write a half-hour script, which was broadcast as a pilot episode of The Liver Birds in April 1969. A short first series followed to little acclaim, leading Mills to decline to produce a second series, changing his mind only when Lane and Taylor wrote a series of new scripts. The series became one of the most popular of the time, characterised by Lane's "ability to conjure laughs out of pathos and life's little tragedies". Upon Mills' departure from the position of head of comedy at the BBC in 1972, Lane took sole responsibility for writing the scripts beginning in 1973.

Her successful screenwriting career continued through the 1970s and 1980s, in particular with the 1978–1983 sitcom Butterflies and the 1986–1991 sitcom Bread.

In Butterflies, described as "undoubtedly ... her finest work", she addressed the lead character's desires for freedom from her "decent but dull" husband. Wendy Craig, who starred in Butterflies, said of Lane: "Her greatest gift was that she understood women and wrote the truth about them ... She spoke about what others didn't. In the case of [Craig's lead character], it was all about what was going on inside her – and many other women at the time."

In Bread, which ran for seven series, "she became the first woman to mine television comedy from sexual and personal relationships through a galère of expertly-etched contemporary characters, developed against a backdrop of social issues such as divorce, adultery and.. alcoholism."  In the late 1980s, Bread had the third-highest viewing figures on British television, beaten only by EastEnders and Neighbours. However, Bread was criticised by some in Liverpool for portraying a stereotypical view of people in the city, an opinion that Lane rejected.

Animal welfare

Lane had been a vegetarian dedicated to the care and welfare of animals since 1965, She established the "Animal Line" trust in 1990 with her friends Rita Tushingham and Linda McCartney. In 1991, she bought Saint Tudwal's Island East off the coast of Wales, to protect its wildlife. In 1993, Lane converted the grounds of her mansion, Broadhurst Manor in Horsted Keynes, Sussex, into a 25-acre animal sanctuary. She operated the sanctuary for 15 years before having to close operations due to financial constraints.

In 2002, Lane returned her OBE to then prime minister Tony Blair in protest against animal cruelty. In 2013, an animal sanctuary named after her was opened in Melling, Merseyside.

Later life and death
Lane published her autobiography, Someday I'll Find Me: Carla Lane's Autobiography, in 2006. She returned to Liverpool in 2009. Lane died, aged 87, at Stapley Nursing Home in Mossley Hill, in Liverpool, on 31 May 2016.

Television series

1969–1979, 1996: The Liver Birds (with Myra Taylor and others)
1971–1976: Bless This House (with Myra Taylor and others)
1974: No Strings
1975: Going, Going, Gone ... Free?
1977: Three Piece Suite
1978–1983, 2000: Butterflies
1981–1983: The Last Song
1981–1982: Solo
1984–1985: Leaving
1985–1987: The Mistress
1985–1986: I Woke Up One Morning
1986–1991: Bread
1992: Screaming
1993–1994: Luv
1995: Searching

See also
 List of animal rights advocates

References

External links

1928 births
2016 deaths
20th-century English women writers
20th-century English dramatists and playwrights
Animal welfare workers
English activists
English women activists
English women dramatists and playwrights
English television writers
Officers of the Order of the British Empire
Pseudonymous women writers
British women television writers
Writers from Liverpool
20th-century English screenwriters
People from Horsted Keynes
20th-century pseudonymous writers